Bragginsella is a genus of liverworts belonging to the family Lophocoleaceae.

The species of this genus are found in New Zealand.

Species:
 Bragginsella anomala R.M.Schust. 

The genus name of Bragginsella is in honour of John Edward Braggins (b.1944) a New Zealand born botanist (Pteridology, Mycology, Lichenology),
from the University of Auckland and the Auckland Museum for Natural Sciences.

The genus was circumscribed in The Bryologist Vol.100 on page 363 in 1997.

References

Jungermanniales
Jungermanniales genera